Sean Everet Johnson (born May 31, 1989) is an American professional soccer player who plays as a goalkeeper for Major League Soccer club Toronto FC and the United States national team.

Career

College and amateur

Johnson grew up in Lilburn, Georgia where he attended Brookwood High School. For a brief period he attended school in California where he played for his high school in Los Angeles County. He would graduate from there in 2005.

Johnson moved to Florida to play college soccer at the University of Central Florida, where he earned Member of the C-USA Commissioner's Honor Roll and was named Team MVP in 2008. He left college early to enter the 2010 MLS SuperDraft as a Generation Adidas player.

During his college years Johnson also played one season with Atlanta Blackhawks in the USL Premier Development League.

Professional
Sean Johnson was drafted in the fourth round (51st overall) of the 2010 MLS SuperDraft by Chicago Fire. He was the last Generation Adidas player selected in that draft. He made his MLS debut on August 1, 2010, during a 3–2 victory over Los Angeles Galaxy after earning the starting spot over Andrew Dykstra. In his rookie season, he earned back to back "Save of the Week" honors. In 2013, he was named the Chicago Fire's Defender of the Year.  He had an 11–9–7 record with the Fire, including with 6 clean sheets.

On December 11, 2016, Atlanta United acquired Johnson from the Chicago Fire for general allocation money. Later that day New York City FC acquired Johnson from Atlanta United in exchange for general allocation money and target allocation money. He made 206 total appearances for NYCFC and won the 2021 MLS Cup with the club as their starting goalkeeper.

On January 27, 2023, Johnson signed a two-year contract with Toronto FC.

International
Johnson holds United States and Jamaican citizenships.  He had brief tryouts with the Jamaican under-17 team in 2005 and under-20 team in 2008.

Johnson was selected to the United States men's national under-20 team in 2009.  He appeared in one match in the 2009 CONCACAF U-20 Championship and later took part in three friendly matches. He also participated in the 2009 FIFA U-20 World Cup as an unused substitute.

Johnson was a member of the under-23 national team that participated in the 2012 Olympic Games qualifying tournament.  After an injury to Bill Hamid, Johnson entered the game on the 39th minute of the last group match against El Salvador.

Johnson earned his first senior cap for the United States national team entering as a halftime substitute in a friendly match against Chile on January 22, 2011.

Johnson was named one of three goalkeepers assigned to the United States's 2013 CONCACAF Gold Cup roster by coach Jurgen Klinsmann. He served as second choice keeper to Nick Rimando during a pre-tournament friendly against Guatemala and for the duration of the tournament. Johnson earned his first senior national team start on July 17, 2013, in the final match of the group stage, recording a clean sheet in a 1–0 victory against rival Costa Rica. During that game he made a key save in the 80th minute which led to the US's winning goal. The start officially cap-tied the dual-national Johnson to the United States.

Personal life
His parents, Everet and Joy Johnson, are of Jamaican and African-American descent.

Career statistics

Club

International

Honors
New York City FC
MLS Cup: 2021

United States
CONCACAF Gold Cup: 2013, 2017, 2021

Individual
MLS Cup MVP: 2021
MLS All-Star: 2022

References

External links
 
 Chicago Fire player profile
 
 FIFA bio

1989 births
Living people
People from Lilburn, Georgia
Sportspeople from the Atlanta metropolitan area
Soccer players from Georgia (U.S. state)
African-American soccer players
American soccer players
Association football goalkeepers
University of Central Florida alumni
UCF Knights men's soccer players
Atlanta Blackhawks players
Chicago Fire FC draft picks
Chicago Fire FC players
New York City FC players
Toronto FC players
USL League Two players
Major League Soccer players
United States men's under-20 international soccer players
United States men's under-23 international soccer players
United States men's international soccer players
2013 CONCACAF Gold Cup players
2017 CONCACAF Gold Cup players
2019 CONCACAF Gold Cup players
2021 CONCACAF Gold Cup players
2022 FIFA World Cup players
CONCACAF Gold Cup-winning players
21st-century African-American sportspeople
20th-century African-American people